KKKK may refer to:

 Kandukondain Kandukondain, a 2000 Tamil musical and romantic film based on Jane Austen's novel Sense and Sensibility
 The Knights of the Ku Klux Klan, an independent chapter of the Ku Klux Klan
 KHKX, a radio station (99.1 FM), licensed to serve Odessa, Texas, which held the call sign KKKK from 1977 until 1998
 KMMZ, a radio station (101.3 FM), licensed to serve Crane, Texas, which held the call sign KKKK from 1998 to 2004
 KFCS, a radio station (1580 AM) licensed to serve Colorado Springs, Colorado, which held the call sign KKKK from 2005 to 2010
 KPOM-LP, a defunct low-power Class A television station (Ch. 6 analog) formerly licensed to serve Indio, California, United States, which held the call sign KKKK-CA from 2012 to 2013